"Death and What Comes Next" is a fantasy short story by British writer Terry Pratchett, part of his Discworld series. It tells the story of a discussion between Death and a philosopher, in which the philosopher attempts to use the many-worlds interpretation of quantum mechanics to argue that death is not a certainty.

The story was written in 2002 for the now-defunct online puzzle game TimeHunt and the text contains a hidden word puzzle, also devised by Pratchett, which provided a codeword for the game.

Like "Theatre of Cruelty", another of his short stories, Pratchett allowed it to be put on the L-Space Web.

See also 
Parallel universe (fiction)

External links
 
The "Death and What Comes Next" L-Space page including various translations

Discworld short stories
Fantasy short stories